Mullazai (ملازئی) is a Baloch tribe found in  Panjgur District (پنجگور) of Balochistan, Pakistan and Tank District of Khyber Pakhtunkhwa, Pakistan. They are known as 'Mullas' and are descendants of Mir Mulla Shehsawar, who they claim to have migrated from Iran Sarbaz in 1513AD. The Mullazai tribe numbers in Panjgur are about 200 families or about 5000 persons. Other tribes associated with the Mullazai settled in Panjgur, Mastung, Sorab, Kalat, Kharan, Quetta, Kucklak, Nushki, Dalbandin, Qandahar and Iran.

Etymology 
Mullazai in Balochi means descendants of mollas who was a religious man.

Location
Tasp is largest of the Panjgur townships and has a Mullazai population numbering around 600 families. Other places where the tribe have settled include Khubadan and Kallag. There, the tribe mainly work cultivating dates, amiraris. The date groves extend in places to nearly mile away from the river. Southwest of Tasp is Sorowan and has the Khushkawa, where some of the tribe still live.

History

The first mosque in Panjgur was built in 1513 in Tasp By Mulla Shehsawar, an ancestor of the tribe.

The Mullazai are known as Akhoonds, Mala Zai, Mali Zai or Mollazahis Clans of the tribe include Kenagzai, Halazai, Sahibzada, Miazai, Gowarazai and Akundzai . These are the direct descendants of the tribe who left Iran and settled in Pakistan.

Economy
The economy of the tribe in mainly depends on farming and engineering. Also, many of the inhabitants work in the local schools and hospitals as well as travel to work in the Royal Army of Oman.

Mullazai are known for the connections with the Kalat State before 1947. The annexation of Balochistan into Pakistan resulted in a turmoil in this region of Balochistan which largely affected the Mullazai tribe and its political grip, but with little impact on the socio-economic activities of the people. Agriculture is dependent on the significant local rainfall and from tube wells. Many people from Tasp also work as contractors in Oman and the United Arab Emirates.

Education
There are institutions that range from primary to high school level. There is one High School for boys and one for girls. Every year those students who pass their examinations and continue on to higher education have to do so outside the Panjgur District. A late landlord Mir Haji Ghulam Jan Mullazai from kallag hoped to promote education in the area and donated property for the use of a high school for girls and for a primary school.

People 

The local Jirga make the local religious decisions and maintain the customs of the area based on their set of laws and principles.

See also
Khwajikhel

References

Baloch tribes